Beautiful Nightmare may refer to:

 "Beautiful Nightmare", a song by Skylar Grey 
 "Sweet Dreams" (Beyoncé song), a 2009 song originally titled "Beautiful Nightmare" by Beyoncé Knowles 
 Beautiful Nightmare (album), 2012 album by Reece Mastin
 "The Beautiful Nightmare," a ring name briefly held by wrestler Katarina Waters in 2009 during her time in ECW